Toby Smith (born 10 October 1988) is a retired Australian rugby union player. He played prop for the Chiefs, Rebels and in Super Rugby, and for the Australian national rugby union team internationally.

Playing career

Waikato 

Smith began his rugby career in New Zealand, debuting for ITM Cup team Waikato in 2008.

Chiefs 
Smith played for the Chiefs in Super Rugby between 2010 and 2013, helping the team win back-to-back Super Rugby titles in 2012 and 2013.

Rebels & Wallabies 
In 2014, Smith joined the Melbourne Rebels, and the Melbourne Rising of the National Rugby Championship. Smith was named in the Wallabies squad for the Rugby Championship in 2015, and was later named in the Wallabies' 31-man squad for the 2015 Rugby World Cup, despite being uncapped. On 5 September, he made his international debut coming off the bench against the United States in a Rugby World Cup Warm-up match. Smith notably appeared in the Wallabies' semi-final victory over Argentina, and received a silver medal after Australia's loss to the All Blacks in the final.

Hurricanes 
In 2018 Smith returned to New Zealand, this time playing for the Wellington Super Rugby side the Hurricanes.

Following the 2019 rugby season, Smith, aged 31, announced his retirement from the game due to issues with concussion.

Super Rugby statistics

References

External links 
 
Rebels Profile
Yahoo NZ profile

Living people
1988 births
New Zealand rugby union players
Australian rugby union players
Chiefs (rugby union) players
Waikato rugby union players
Rugby union props
Melbourne Rebels players
Melbourne Rising players
People educated at Hamilton Boys' High School
Barbarian F.C. players
Australia international rugby union players
Hurricanes (rugby union) players
Australian expatriate rugby union players
Expatriate rugby union players in New Zealand
Rugby union players from Queensland